Novosphingobium soli  is a Gram-negative, rod-shaped and non-spore-forming bacterium from the genus Novosphingobium which has been isolated from oil-contaminated soil near an oil refinery in Kaohsiung County in Taiwan.

References

External links
Type strain of Novosphingobium soli at BacDive -  the Bacterial Diversity Metadatabase	

Bacteria described in 2011
Sphingomonadales